Patricia J. Tallman (born September 4, 1957) is an American actress, stunt performer, and studio executive best known for her starring roles in Night of the Living Dead, Star Trek and Babylon 5. She is the former CEO and executive producer of Studio JMS.

Early life and education 
Patricia Tallman is the daughter of Jerry Tallman, a radio entertainer. After graduating from Glenbard West High School in Glen Ellyn, Illinois in 1975, she joined the theater arts program of Carnegie Mellon University, which awarded her a Bachelor of Fine Arts degree.

Career 
In television, Tallman worked on the soap opera Generations. Later, she had guest-starring roles on Tales from the Darkside, as well as the science-fiction shows Star Trek: The Next Generation, Star Trek: Deep Space Nine, and Star Trek: Voyager. As an actress and stunt performer, she worked on 50 episodes across the Star Trek franchise. Tallman played Lyta Alexander in the Babylon 5 series pilot, recurring in seasons two and three, and starring in seasons four and five. Tallman collaborated with fellow Carnegie Mellon alumnus George A. Romero on several films, including Knightriders, Monkey Shines, and Creepshow 2 (in which Tallman performed stunts).

In 1990, Tallman starred as Barbara in the Tom Savini-directed remake of the 1968 film Night of the Living Dead. In 1992, she played the Possessed Witch under heavy make-up in the cult classic Army of Darkness, as well as the Witch in the modern day scenes.

In 1993, Tallman's most notable stunt work came as stunt double for Laura Dern throughout Steven Spielberg's Jurassic Park. In addition, she served as stunt double for Laurel Holloman, who portrayed vampire hunter Justine Cooper in the series Angel, a photo of Tallman was also used as the photo of Justine Cooper's dead twin sister. In a 2001 episode of the TV series Sheena, she guest-starred as the villain Caroline Dula.

Tallman appeared in the 2002 psychological horror short, Jennifer Is Dead, the black comedy For Pete's Wake!, and guest spots on Without a Trace and Castle. Tallman appeared in InAlienable (2008) and the horror film Dead Air (2009). Tallman played Holly in Atlas Shrugged: Part II (2012).

Tallman has performed voice roles including playing the leading part of evil detective Jean Richmond in the Radio Repertory Company of America's production of Lives of the Cat and in some of the Anne Manx sequels (sold as radio plays on CD).

In 2011, Tallman published her autobiography Pleasure Thresholds, the title inspired by the scene she auditioned to earn the role of Lyta Alexander.

In 2012, Tallman became CEO and executive producer of Studio JMS in partnership with her then-boyfriend, J. Michael Straczynski, the creator of Babylon 5. In 2013, she left the company.

In May 2014, Tallman played the male role of Lespere in a theatrical production of Ray Bradbury's Kaleidoscope at Sci-Fest LA 2014, a theater festival. The following year Tallman played the wife in a comedy called A Logic Called Joe at the second Sci-Fest LA.

In 2016, Tallman started Quest Retreats, a VIP adventure excursion company with annual events in Hawaii, London, New Zealand, and South Africa.

Personal life 
Tallman met Andrea Rogantini when he was the executive chef at Prego Ristorante in Los Angeles. Rogantini is the father of her only child, a son named Julian Tallman. Tallman later met Jeffrey Willerth when she was acting on Babylon 5 (1993–1998), where he was as an associate producer. They were married in 1999, separated several years later and divorced in 2008.

Tallman also met J. Michael Straczynski (JMS) when she was acting on Babylon 5, a series which he created. The two entered into a relationship sometime after Straczynski separated from his wife, Kathryn M. Drennan, in 2002. They separated in 2013.

Tallman is a leading fund-raiser for Penny Lane, a center for abused children in California. , she has been leading their annual “Be a Santa Toy Drive” for more than 20 years.

Selected filmography

References

External links 

 
 
 

1957 births
American film actresses
Actresses from Illinois
American soap opera actresses
American stunt performers
American television actresses
Living people
People from Glen Ellyn, Illinois
20th-century American actresses
21st-century American actresses
Carnegie Mellon University College of Fine Arts alumni
American women chief executives